William V, Prince of Wied (22 August 184522 October 1907) was a German officer and politician, elder son of Hermann, Prince of Wied. He was the father of William, Prince of Albania and brother of Queen Elisabeth of Romania. By birth he was a member of the House of Wied.

Early life
William was the second child and first son of Hermann, Prince of Wied (1814–1864), son of Johann August Karl, Prince of Wied and Princess Sophie Auguste of Solms-Braunfels, and his wife, Princess Marie of Nassau (1825–1902), daughter of William, Duke of Nassau and his first wife Princess Louise of Saxe-Hildburghausen. Through his mother he was descendant of William IV stadtholder of the Netherlands and George II of Great Britain.

Military career
During the Austro-Prussian War in 1866, he was a lieutenant general staff of the 2nd Army. During 1870-71 he attended Franco-Prussian War.

Between 1893 and 1897 he was the Imperial commissioner and military Chief of volunteer nurses in the army. In 1893 he was appointed as General of Infantry à la suite.

Politics
Politically, William was a supporter of colonial policy. Between 1891 and 1892 he was chairman of the German anti-slavery committees. This funded include expeditions to unexplored areas in Africa. Since 1897, he was a member of the Colonial Council. William was co-founder and from 1898 to 1901 President of the Navy League.

Between 1875 and 1886 he was Marshal of Rhine Province parliament. He was from 1888 to 1894 and from 1899 to 1901 Chairman of the Rhine Province parliament. Since 1878, he was a member of the Prussian House of Lords. Which he was president from 1897 to 1904.

Marriage

William married on 18 July 1871 in Wassenaar, Princess Marie of the Netherlands (1841–1910), younger daughter of Prince Frederick of the Netherlands (1792–1839) second son of William I of the Netherlands, and his wife, Princess Louise of Prussia (1808–1870), daughter of Frederick William III of Prussia.

They had six children:
Friedrich, Prince of Wied (27 June 1872 – 18 June 1945) married Princess Pauline of Württemberg (1877–1965), had issue.
Prince Alexander of Wied (28 May 1874 – 15 January 1877)
Wilhelm, Prince of Albania (26 March 1876 –  18 April 1945) married Princess Sophie of Schönburg-Waldenburg (1885–1936), had issue.
Prince Victor of Wied (7 December 1877 – 1 March 1946) married Countess Gisela of Solms-Wildenfels (30 December 1891, Wildenfels, Germany – 20 August 1976, Oberammergau, Germany) on 6 June 1912, had issue:
Marie Elisabeth of Wied (14 March 1913 - 30 March 1985, Augsburg, Germany)
Benigna Viktoria of Wied (23 July 1918 - 1972). Married Ernst Hartmann, Baron of Schlotheim (27 December 1914, Wiesbaden, Germany - 31 October 1952, Wiesbaden, Germany) on 19 December 1939. They had two daughters:
Viktoria Elisabeth, Baroness of Schlotheim (b. 11 April 1948, Wiesbaden, Germany)
Christine, Baroness of Schlotheim (b. 22 July 1950, Wiesbaden, Germany)
Princess Louise of Wied (24 October 1880 – 29 August 1965)
Princess Elisabeth of Wied (28 January 1883 – 14 November 1938)

Honours
He received the following orders and decorations:

Ancestry

Notes and sources

thePeerage.com - Wilhelm Adolph Maximilian Karl Fürst von Wied
The Royal House of Stuart, London, 1969, 1971, 1976, Addington, A. C., Reference: 336

Specific

1845 births
1907 deaths
Members of the Prussian House of Lords
People from Neuwied
House of Wied-Neuwied
Recipients of the Iron Cross, 1st class
Knights Third Class of the Military Order of William
Recipients of the Order of the Netherlands Lion
Grand Crosses of the Order of the Star of Romania
Honorary Knights Grand Cross of the Royal Victorian Order